Mt. Pleasant Methodist Church is a historic Methodist church at 2382 Wright Road in Caledonia, Mississippi.

It was built in 1892 and added to the National Register in 2007.

References

Methodist churches in Mississippi
Churches on the National Register of Historic Places in Mississippi
Churches completed in 1892
National Register of Historic Places in Lowndes County, Mississippi